The 1971–72 Shell Shield season was the fifth edition of what is now the Regional Four Day Competition, the domestic first-class cricket competition for the countries of the West Indies Cricket Board (WICB). The tournament was sponsored by Royal Dutch Shell, with matches played from 21 January to 3 March 1972.

Five teams contested the competition – Barbados, the Combined Islands, Guyana, Jamaica, and Trinidad and Tobago. Barbados were undefeated, winning three of their four matches and drawing the other to claim a third title (and first since the 1966–67 season). Jamaican batsman Maurice Foster led the tournament in runs, while Barbadian fast bowler Vanburn Holder was the leading wicket-taker.

Points table

Key

 W – Outright win (12 points)
 L – Outright loss (0 points)
 LWF – Lost, but won first innings (4 points)

 DWF – Drawn, but won first innings (6 points)
 DLF – Drawn, but lost first innings (2 points)
 Pts – Total points

Statistics

Most runs
The top five run-scorers are included in this table, listed by runs scored and then by batting average.

Most wickets

The top five wicket-takers are listed in this table, listed by wickets taken and then by bowling average.

References

West Indian cricket seasons from 1970–71 to 1999–2000
1972 in West Indian cricket
Regional Four Day Competition seasons
Domestic cricket competitions in 1971–72